Jeffrey Stewart Heath AM (15 October 1955 – 7 March 2004) was an Australian Paralympic archer and a disability publisher and advocate.

Personal
Heath was born on 15 October 1955 at Glenelg, South Australia. From the age of seven he used a wheelchair due to bone cancer. In 1979, Heath completed an Associate Diploma (Recreation), Salisbury CAE and in 1983 he completed a Bachelor of Arts (Recreation), University of South Australia. He was married to Yvonne Baillie and they have a daughter.  He died of mesothelioma on 7 March 2004.

Sporting career
Heath competed in archery and dartchery at the 1976 Summer Paralympic Games in Toronto, Canada. He finished eleventh in the Men's Novice Round Open, ninth in the Men's Pairs Open and eighth in the Mixed Novice and Tetraplegics Round Team A-C.

Employment
Heath's employment involved working on disability and inclusion issues for organisations based in Adelaide. He was the editor of Link, a leasing Australian disability magazine. He was the founder of the Disability Information Resource Centre in Adelaide. From 1988 to 1993, he was Executive Director of Disabled Peoples International (DPI) South Australia.

Politics
Heath was a member of the Australian Democrats, representative for South Australia on the national executive and national journal editor. He unsuccessfully stood for the electorate of Norwood at the 1982 South Australian state election. At the 2001 Australian Federal Election, he was number two on the South Australian Senate ticket and was not elected.

Recognition
 1972 - Queen Scout Award, a Rotary youth leadership award 
 1981 - Selected to lead Australia's first street march for people with disabilities in Sydney in 1981.
 1996 - Churchill Fellowship to study the production and exhibition of goods and services for the disabled - Germany, United Kingdom and United States.
 2000 - Torch bearer Sydney 2000 Paralympics.
 2003 - Member of the Order of Australia for service to people with disabilities as an advocate for improved services and through the publication of Link magazine.

References

External links
 Jeff Heath Website at Wayback Machine

Paralympic archers of Australia
Paralympic dartchers of Australia
Australian male archers
Archers at the 1976 Summer Paralympics
Dartchers at the 1976 Summer Paralympics
Wheelchair category Paralympic competitors
Australian disability rights activists
Deaths from mesothelioma
Members of the Order of Australia
1955 births
2004 deaths
Paralympic athletes of Australia
Deaths from cancer in Australia